Shinyanga Airport  is an airport serving the small city of Shinyanga, the capital of the Shinyanga Region of Tanzania. The airport is also known as Ibadakuli Airport.

See also

List of airports in Tanzania
Transport in Tanzania

References

External links
OurAirports – Shinyanga
SkyVector - Shinyanga/Ibadakuli Airport
OpenStreetMap – Shinyanga

Airports in Tanzania
Buildings and structures in the Shinyanga Region